Sangamam is a 1999 Indian Tamil-language musical romance dance film co written and directed by Suresh Krissna and produced by V. Natarajan of Pyramid Films. The film stars Rahman and newcomer Vindhya with Manivannan, Vijayakumar, Radharavi, and Vadivelu playing other important roles. The film's music was composed by A. R. Rahman, while Saravanan handled the cinematography. The film was released in 1999 but despite the award-winning soundtracks and rave reviews, the film became a financial failure.
First release Sun TV network

Plot 
This film depicts the disputes between two forms of the dance styles and music, Classical Indian (in particular Carnatic music and Bharathanatyam danceform) against rural Tamil folk music and dance. The film depicts the misunderstanding and mutual ignorance of the two factions. The parallel plot in the movie is of the children and intended successors of the respective dance doyens falling in love with each other.

Cast 

 Rahman as Selvam
 Vindhya as Abhirami
 Manivannan as Aavudapillai
 Vijayakumar as Sivasankaramoorthy
 Radharavi as Nagaraj
 Vadivelu as Haridas
 Delhi Ganesh as Abhirami's uncle
 Charle as Shanmugam
 Srividya as Sivagami, Abhirami's mother
 S. N. Lakshmi as Meenakhi alias Meenu
 Lavanya as Selvam's sister
 Thyagu as Selvam's friend
 Vennira Aadai Moorthy as Narayana
 Kavithalaya Krishnan as Abhirami's uncle
 Madhan Bob as an instrument vendor
 Kumar Natarajan
 Soori in an uncredited role

Production 
V. Natarajan launched a film to be directed by Suresh Krishna and A. R. Rahman was signed on to compose the music for the film in early 1998, while he was also working with the producer Natarajan in Rhythm and Udhaya. In an interview in August 1998, A. R. Rahman revealed that he was working on " a very small budget movie called Sangamam which is based on classical and folk dance". The film would feature his  co-brother, Malayalam actor Rahman in the lead role with newcomer Vindhya roped in to play the lead female role.

During production it was reported that the film would be a remake of the 1968 film Thillaanaa Mohanambal which starred Sivaji Ganesan and Padmini, but this was subsequently found to be untrue. The film was briefly delayed in 1999 as A. R. Rahman was too busy to complete the background score for the film, with producer V. Natarajan initially refusing to pay him, causing further delays for the producer's next venture, Rhythm.

Soundtrack 

The film's music was composed by A. R. Rahman. The music album of this also made news for the first time rapport of the veteran musician M. S. Viswanathan pairing up with A. R. Rahman. The soundtracks also boasts of prominent singers like S. Janaki, Hariharan, Unni Krishnan, Nithyasree Mahadevan, Sujatha and Shankar Mahadevan. The soundtrack features 6 songs composed by A. R. Rahman, with lyrics by Vairamuthu. The soundtrack received critical acclaim and Rahman won the Tamil Nadu State Film Award for Best Music Director for the soundtrack he composed.The song "Mudhal Murai Killipparthaein", composed in Bihag ragam, won a National Film Award for Best Lyrics for lyricist Vairamuthu.

Release and reception 
The film opened to mixed reviews with a critic writing that "Sangamam is a credible movie with good music by A. R. Rahman and superlative performance by Manivannan". The critic added that "Rahman does justice to his role and has brought a certain dignity and understatement to his character" but that "Vindhya, the heroine is the only weak link". Sandya of Indolink.com mentioned to "see it for the songs, like it for the songs, forget the movie", labelling that Vindhya "couldn't act for nuts". New Straits Times wrote "You should see this movie if you like A. R. Rahman's music. It makes for a pleasant viewing". The film was also set to be dubbed and released in Telugu under the same name, but the financial losses suffered had deterred the version.

Due to commercial failure, Sun TV, who bought the satellite rights of the film, premiered in just 3 days after its release that too it was running in few theatres.

Accolades

References

External links 

1999 films
Indian musical drama films
Indian dance films
1999 romantic drama films
1990s Tamil-language films
Films directed by Suresh Krissna
Films scored by A. R. Rahman
Films about music and musicians
Indian romantic musical films
Indian romantic drama films
Films set in Tiruchirappalli